Oleg Aleksandrovich Kuzmin (born 9 May 1981) is a Russian football coach and a former player. He works as an assistant coach with Rubin Kazan. He played as a right back.

Honours

Club
Rubin Kazan
Russian Cup: 2011–12.
Russian Super Cup: 2012.

International
In October 2009, he was called up to the Russia national football team for the 2010 FIFA World Cup qualifier against Azerbaijan. He was called up again in August 2015 for the UEFA Euro 2016 qualifiers against Sweden and against Liechtenstein. He made his national team debut, at the age of 34, in the game against Sweden on 5 September 2015. He scored his first goal for the Russia national football team on 12 October 2015 in a game against Montenegro

Career statistics

Notes

International goals

External links
  Player page on the official FC Moscow website

References

1981 births
Footballers from Moscow
Living people
Russian footballers
Association football defenders
Russia under-21 international footballers
Russia international footballers
FC Spartak Moscow players
FC Elista players
FC Chernomorets Novorossiysk players
FC Moscow players
FC Lokomotiv Moscow players
FC Rubin Kazan players
Russian Premier League players
FC Spartak-2 Moscow players